Dustin Bixler (born December 21, 1982 in Mechanicsburg, Pennsylvania) is a former American soccer player who spent his entire career with Harrisburg City Islanders.

Career

College
Bixler attended Red Land High School and was a four-year starter at Lock Haven University, playing 71 career games and earning All-Conference honors in 2002, 2003, and 2004. He was also named to the Division II All-Northeast Region First Team in 2003 and 2004, and was voted the team’s Most Valuable Player and the Conference’s Athlete of the Year after his senior season.

Professional
Bixler turned professional when he signed with Harrisburg City Islanders of the USL Second Division in 2005. He made his professional debut on May 5, 2007 as a substitute in a 4-3 win over the Charlotte Eagles.

He was named to the 2008 All-League Second Team, was MVP of the 2007 USL-2 Championship Match, and is Harrisburg’s all-time leader in starts and minutes played. On February 2, 2010 Harrisburg City announced the re-signing of Bixler for the 2010 season.

Bixler scored his first professional goal on his 88th appearance for Harrisburg, a 2-1 victory over the Charleston Battery on May 22, 2010.

He re-signed with the club on March 11, 2011.

On September 7, 2012, Bixler announced his retirement from professional soccer after eight seasons, all with Harrisburg City.

Coaching
Bixler is also the head coach of the Cedar Crest High School boys varsity soccer team.

References

External links
 Harrisburg City Islanders bio

1982 births
Living people
American soccer players
Penn FC players
USL Second Division players
USL Championship players
People from Mechanicsburg, Pennsylvania
Association football defenders